An explosive device is a device that relies on the exothermic reaction of an explosive material to provide a violent release of energy.

Applications of explosive devices include:
Building implosion (demolition)
Excavation
Explosive forming
Explosive welding
Mining
Murder
Assassination
Riot control
Terrorism
War

Types of explosive devices include:
Explosive weapon
Anti-personnel mine
Artillery shells
Bomb
Grenade
Improvised explosive device
Land mine
Nuclear explosive device
Unexploded ordnance
Car bomb
Letter bomb
Stun grenade
Some pyrotechnics
Fireworks
Explosively pumped flux compression generator
Explosive-driven ferroelectric generator

Demolition
hu:Robbanóeszköz